Rameswaram is a village of Sakhinetipalli Mandal in Konaseema district, Andhra Pradesh, India.

References

Villages in East Godavari district